Arthrogryposis–renal dysfunction–cholestasis syndrome is a cutaneous condition caused by a mutation in the VPS33B gene. Most of the cases have been survived for infancy. Recently, College of Medical Sciences in Nepal reports a case of ARC syndrome in a girl at the age of more than 18 years.

See also 
 Multiple sulfatase deficiency
 List of cutaneous conditions

References

External links 

Genodermatoses
Syndromes